Gary "Tex" Brockette (September 13, 1947 – January 1, 2010) was an American actor, assistant director, writer and co-producer. He was born in Denton, Texas.

Career
Gary Brockette began his career working as an actor in New York. He played the role of Bobby Sheen in 1971's The Last Picture Show and Frank Cameron in Encounter with the Unknown. He also appeared in the 1984 movies, The Philadelphia Experiment and The Ice Pirates.  As a character actor, he made guest appearances on such television shows as Trapper John, M.D. and Charlie's Angels. He also wrote, directed, and edited a short film called Deceit in 2009.

Brockette was married to actress Sandra Brown who played Diane in the 1973 blaxploitation The Mack.

Death
Gary Brockette died on January 1, 2010, from complications of cancer.

Filmography

References

External links

1947 births
2010 deaths
Male actors from Texas
Deaths from cancer in California
People from Denton, Texas
American male film actors
American male television actors
Film producers from Texas
Film directors from Texas